Uuno Turhapuro – This Is My Life is a 2004 Finnish comedy film, made as a tribute to Spede Pasanen. It is the twentieth and last installment in the Uuno Turhapuro film series.

Plot
Uuno disguises as an old man and infiltrates a nursing home for rich old people, where his father-in-law also lives. The ever-hungry Uuno is seduced by the table groaning with food, but as it happens, he never manages to be there at dinnertime.

Meanwhile, Sörsselssön enters Uuno for a TV competition named This Is My Life, where contestants tell about their life as viewers vote them either to continue or out of the show. The nursing home elderly watch on TV as Uuno tells the show's host his life story.

Production
After Spede Pasanen died in 2001, a group led by Ere Kokkonen decided to make a final Turhapuro movie in remembrance of him. The plot is based on a common concept which Spede and Ere had of Uuno in a nursing home for the elderly. The film features much archival footage from prior entries in the series. Spede's character, Härski Hartikainen, appears exclusively through this material.

Many Finnish celebrities can be seen doing cameo roles, such as Danny, Mika Häkkinen, Tanja Karpela and Ben Zyskowicz.

External links 
 

Spede Pasanen
2000s Finnish-language films
2004 films
2004 comedy films
Finnish comedy films
Finnish sequel films